Graeme Wood may refer to:

Graeme Wood (businessman) (born 1947), Australian entrepreneur and environmentalist
Graeme Wood (cricketer) (born 1956), Australian former cricketer
Graeme Wood (journalist) (born 1979), American journalist and academic

See also
 Graham Wood (disambiguation)